Fort Bragg is a military installation of the United States Army in North Carolina, and is one of the largest military installations in the world by population, with around 54,000 military personnel. The military reservation is located within Cumberland and Hoke counties, and borders the towns of Fayetteville, Spring Lake, and Southern Pines. It was also a census-designated place in the 2000 census, during which a residential population of 29,183 was identified.

It is named for native North Carolinian Confederate General Braxton Bragg, who had previously served in the United States Army in the Mexican–American War. Fort Bragg is one of ten United States Army installations named for officers who fought for the Confederacy in the American Civil War. The National Defense Authorization Act for Fiscal Year 2021, passed over an attempted veto by President Trump, includes a provision that all 10 Army bases named after prominent Confederate military leaders be renamed. The Naming Commission has proposed renaming the installation Fort Liberty. On 5 January 2023 William A. LaPlante, US under-secretary of defense for acquisition and sustainment (USD (A&S)) directed the full implementation of the recommendations of the Naming Commission, DoD-wide; the renaming occurs the first week in June 2023.

It is the home of the Army's XVIII Airborne Corps and is the headquarters of the United States Army Special Operations Command, which oversees the U.S. Army 1st Special Forces Command (Airborne) and 75th Ranger Regiment. It is also home to the U.S. Army Forces Command, U.S. Army Reserve Command, and Womack Army Medical Center. Fort Bragg maintains two airfields: Pope Field, where the United States Air Force stations global airlift and special operations assets as well as the Air Force Combat Control School, and Simmons Army Airfield, where Army aviation units support the needs of airborne and special operations forces on post.

History

World War I
Camp Bragg was established in 1918 as an artillery training ground. The Chief of Field Artillery, General William J. Snow, was seeking an area having suitable terrain, adequate water, rail facilities, and a climate suitable for year-round training, and he decided that the area now known as Fort Bragg met all of the desired criteria. Camp Bragg was named for Braxton Bragg, a former U.S. Army artillery commander and West Point graduate who later fought for the Confederacy during the American Civil War.

The aim was for six artillery brigades to be stationed there and $6,000,000 was spent on the land and cantonments. There was an airfield on the camp used by aircraft and balloons for artillery spotters. The airfield was named Pope Field on April 1, 1919, in honor of First Lieutenant Harley H. Pope, an airman who was killed while flying nearby. The work on the camp was finished on November 1, 1919.

The original plan for six brigades was abandoned after World War I ended and once demobilization had started. The artillerymen, and their equipment and material from Camp McClellan, Alabama, were moved to Fort Bragg and testing began on long-range weapons that were a product of the war. The six artillery brigades were reduced to two cantonments and a garrison was to be built for Army troops as well as a National Guard training center. In early 1921 two field artillery units, the 13th and 17th Field Artillery Brigades, began training at Camp Bragg. The same year, the Long Street Church and six acres of property were acquired for the reservation. The church was listed on the National Register of Historic Places in 1974.

Due to the post-war cutbacks, the camp was nearly closed for good when the War department issued orders to close the camp on August 7, 1921. General Albert J. Bowley was commander at the camp and after much campaigning, and getting the Secretary of War to visit the camp, the closing order was canceled on September 16, 1921. The Field Artillery Board was transferred to Fort Bragg on February 1, 1922.

Camp Bragg was renamed Fort Bragg, to signify becoming a permanent Army post, on September 30, 1922. From 1923 to 1924 permanent structures were constructed on Fort Bragg, including four barracks.

World War II
By 1940, the year after World War II started, the population of Fort Bragg was 5,400 and by the following year had reached 67,000. Various units trained at Fort Bragg during World War II, including the 9th Infantry Division, 2nd Armored Division, 82nd Airborne Division, 100th Infantry Division, and various field artillery groups. The population reached a peak of 159,000 during the war years.

Cold War

Following World War II, the 82nd Airborne Division was permanently stationed at Fort Bragg, the only large unit there for some time. In July 1951, the XVIII Airborne Corps was reactivated at Fort Bragg. Fort Bragg became a center for unconventional warfare, with the creation of the Psychological Warfare Center in April 1952, followed by the 10th Special Forces Group.

In 1961, the 5th Special Forces Group (Airborne) was activated at Fort Bragg, with the mission of training counter-insurgency forces in Southeast Asia.  Also in 1961, the "Iron Mike" statue, a tribute to all Airborne soldiers, past, present, and future was dedicated. In early 1962 the 326 Army Security Agency Company, de-activated after the Korean War, was reactivated at Ft. Bragg under XVIIIth Corps. In August of that year, an operational contingent of that Company was relocated to Homestead AFB Florida, due to the Cuban Missile Crisis. Circa 1963, that contingent was reassigned to the newly created USASA 6th Field Station. More than 200,000 young men underwent basic combat training here during the period 1966–70.  At the peak of the Vietnam War in 1968, Fort Bragg's military population rose to 57,840.  In June 1972, the 1st Corps Support Command arrived at Fort Bragg.

In the 1980s, there was a series of deployments of tenant units to the Caribbean, first to Grenada in 1983, Honduras in 1988, and to Panama in 1989. The 5th Special Forces Group departed Fort Bragg in the late 1980s.

Middle East wars

In 1990, the XVIII Airborne Corps and the 82nd Airborne Division deployed to Saudi Arabia in support of Operation Desert Shield and Operation Desert Storm. In the mid- and late 1990s, there was increased modernization of the facilities in Fort Bragg. The World War II wooden barracks were largely removed, a new main post exchange was built, and Devers Elementary School was opened, along with several other projects.

As a result of campaigns in Afghanistan and Iraq, the units on Fort Bragg have seen a sizeable increase to their operations tempo (OPTEMPO), with units conducting two, three, or even four or more deployments to combat zones. As directed by law, and in accordance with the recommendations of the 2005 Base Realignment and Closure Commission, Fort McPherson, Georgia, closed and U.S. Army Forces Command and U.S. Army Reserve Command relocated to Fort Bragg, North Carolina. A new FORSCOM/U.S. Army Reserve Command Headquarters facility completed construction at Fort Bragg in June 2011. Forces Command hosted June 24, 2011, an Army "Casing of the Colors" ceremony on Fort McPherson and an "uncasing of colors ceremony" on August 1, 2011, at Fort Bragg. On March 1, 2011, Pope Field, the former Pope Air Force Base, was absorbed into Fort Bragg.

Name change to Fort Liberty 
On January 1, 2021, the United States Senate passed a veto override of the William M. (Mac) Thornberry National Defense Authorization Act for Fiscal Year 2021. This new law mandated congress to establish a commission for the renaming of Department of Defense properties named after Confederate leaders. In March 2022, the commission published a list of 87 potential names for nine army installations: Fort Bragg, named after Confederate General Braxton Bragg, among them.

In May 2022, the commission officially recommended that Fort Bragg be renamed Fort Liberty. The commission further gave the Pentagon until October to accept the name change; Secretary of Defense Lloyd J. Austin did so on October 6, 2022. Secretary Austin stated in the memorandum accepting the name change: "In the words of Admiral Michelle M. Howard, the Naming Commission's chair, the commission's goal was to inspire Service members and military communities 'with names or values that have meaning.' The Department's implementation of the Commission's recommendations will do just that - and will give proud new names that are rooted in their local communities and that honor American heroes whose valor, courage, and patriotism exemplify the very best of the United States military." Fort Liberty would be the only installation not to be named after a specific person or persons.

According to a memorandum published by the Pentagon, the new name changes will cost the Department of Defense $62.5 million. In particular, the change to Fort Liberty will cost the Department of Defense $6,374,230, making it the most expensive name change. In accordance with the National Defense Authorization Act, the local garrison will have until early 2024 to complete the name change.

Tenant units

The major commands at the installation are the United States Army Forces Command, the United States Army Reserve Command, and the United States Army Special Operations Command. Several airborne and special operations units of the United States Army are stationed at Fort Bragg, notably the 82nd Airborne Division, the 3rd Special Forces Group (Airborne), and the Delta Force. The latter is controlled by the Joint Special Operations Command, based at Pope Field within Fort Bragg.
 XVIII Airborne Corps:
 Headquarters, XVIII Airborne Corps
 82nd Airborne Division
 Division Headquarters and Headquarters Battalion, 82nd Airborne Division
 1st Infantry Brigade Combat Team "1st Devil Brigade Combat Team"
 2nd Infantry Brigade Combat Team "2nd Falcon Brigade Combat Team"
 3rd Infantry Brigade Combat Team "3rd Panther Brigade Combat Team"
 82nd Airborne Division Artillery
 82nd Airborne Division Sustainment Brigade
 18th Field Artillery Brigade
 20th Engineer Brigade
 525th Military Intelligence Brigade
 16th Military Police Brigade
 44th Medical Brigade
 50th Expeditionary Signal Battalion
 United States Army Special Operations Command:
1st Special Forces Command (Airborne)
 Headquarters and Headquarters Company
 1st Special Forces Command Intelligence Battalion
 3rd Special Forces Group (Airborne)
 4th Psychological Operations Group (Airborne)
 8th Psychological Operations Group (Airborne)
 95th Civil Affairs Brigade (Airborne)
 528th Sustainment Brigade (Airborne)
 United States Army Special Operations Aviation Command
 John F. Kennedy Special Warfare Center and School
 Other Army units on base:
 United States Army Reserve Command
 United States Army Civil Affairs and Psychological Operations Command
 1st Battalion, 313th Regiment (Logistics Support Battalion)
 B Company, 249th Engineer Battalion (Prime Power)
 Airborne and Special Operations Test Directorate
 108th Air Defense Artillery Brigade
 Units at Simmons Army Airfield:
 82nd Aviation Regiment
 Units at Pope Field:
18th Air Support Operations Group
 11th Special Operations Intelligence Squadron
 14th Air Support Operations Squadron
 24th Special Tactics Squadron
 43d Air Mobility Operations Group
 Joint Special Operations Command
1st Special Forces Operational Detachment-Delta (Airborne) (1st SFOD-D (A)) (a.k.a. "Delta Force")
 Joint Communications Unit
 2nd Security Force Assistance Brigade (2nd SFAB)

Geography and ecology

Fort Bragg is at 35°8'21" north, 78°59'57" west (35.139064, −78.999143).

The total area is 0.32% water.

Kiest, Simmons, Boundary Line, McFayden, Hurley and Holland lakes are intensively managed to maintain fish populations. Croatan, Quail, Deer Pen, Overhills, Big Muddy, Little Muddy, Texas, MacArthur, Smith, Mott, and Lindsay lakes are managed, but are not normally treated or restocked since their fish populations are respectable and are maintained naturally. A 1.1 MW floating solar plant with a 2 MW battery is being installed on Big Muddy lake at $36 million.

Ft. Bragg is the only locality where the endangered Saint Francis' satyr butterfly (Neonympha mitchellii francisci) is known to occur.  St. Francis' satyr is found in wetland habitats dominated by graminoids and sedges, such as abandoned beaver dams or along streams with beavers.

Fort Bragg fever, a bacterial zoonotic disease, has been named after it, in reference to an outbreak in 1942.

In 1990, the endangered red-cockaded woodpecker came under the protection of the U.S. Fish and Wildlife Service. This caused a tremendous problem for Fort Bragg, where many of these birds lived. Training stopped, ranges were closed, and troops were temporarily moved to other installations for training.

The Army and the conservationists eventually came to an agreement, which put in place training restrictions around the woodpeckers' habitat. White stripes were painted on trees to indicate the location of the habitats, and restrictions limited the scope and duration of training that could take place within  of these locations.

Today, the clusters of woodpeckers has more than doubled in size (200 to 493), and many of the training restrictions have been lifted.

Demographics

As of the census of 2000, there were 29,183 people, 4,315 households, and 4,215 families residing on the base. Fort Bragg was not recorded as a census-designated place for the 2010 census.

Racial makeup
In 2000, the racial makeup of the base was 58.1% Caucasian, 25.3% African-American, 1.2% Native American, 1.8% Asian, 0.9% Pacific Islander, 8.3% from other races, and 4.4% from two or more races. 15.8% of the population were Hispanic or Latino of any race.

Households
In 2000, there were 4,315 households, out of which 85.3% had children under the age of 18 living with them, 88.9% were married couples living together, 7.2% had a female householder with no husband present, and 2.3% were non-families. 2.1% of all households were made up of individuals, and 0.0% were someone living alone who was 65 years of age or older. The average household size was 3.72, and the average family size was 3.74.

Ages
The age distribution in 2000 was 25.8% under the age of 18, 40.9% from 18 to 24, 32.3% from 25 to 44, 1.1% from 45 to 64, and 0.1% who were 65 years of age or older. The median age was 22 years. For every 100 females, there were 217.1 males. For every 100 females age 18 and over, there were 293.5 males. All of these statistics are typical for military bases.

Income
The median income for a household on the base at the 2000 census was $30,106, and the median income for a family was $29,836. 10.0% of the population and 9.6% of families were below the poverty line. Out of the total population, 11.4% of those under the age of 18 and 0.0% of those 65 and older were living below the poverty line.

Housing
Corvias-managed housing under IMCOM is attracting national attention because of reports of lead contamination, black mold, and asbestos from base residents.

Education
Dependents of staff are educated by Department of Defense Education Activity (DoDEA) schools for K–8.
 Albritton Middle School
 Shugart Middle School
 Irwin Intermediate School
 Bowley Elementary School
 Devers Elementary School
 Gordon Elementary School
 Poole Elementary School
 Shugart Elementary School
 Hampton Primary School

For high school students attend local public schools based on what county they reside in: Cumberland County Schools for Cumberland County residents, and Hoke County Schools for Hoke County residents. The Cumberland County parts of the military reservation are assigned to EE Smith High School.

The Linden Oaks area, within Harnett County, is in Harnett County Schools, and is assigned to Overhills High School.

Notable events
 In January 1942, Mickey Rooney visited Fort Bragg to entertain the soldiers.  Two years later, he was drafted and served in the Army until the end of World War II.
 On October 12, 1961, President John F. Kennedy visits Ft. Bragg and the US Army Special Warfare Center and officializes the wear of the Green Beret.
 On February 17, 1970, Jeffrey R. MacDonald murdered his pregnant wife and two daughters. The events surrounding the murders were retold in the book Fatal Vision, itself made into a television miniseries of the same name.
 On May 10, 1987, President Ronald Reagan visits during a USO show with Bob Hope and other celebrities.
 On July 1, 1987, a C-130 crashes during a public demonstration at the Sicily Drop Zone.  Four airmen and one soldier die.
In 1988, US Army soldier Ronald Gray raped and murdered a female soldier and civilians.
 On March 23, 1994, twenty-four members of Fort Bragg's 82nd Airborne Division were killed and over 100 others injured while preparing for a routine airborne training operation during the Green Ramp disaster at neighboring Pope Air Force base. It was the worst peacetime loss of life suffered by the division since the end of World War II.
 On October 27, 1995, William Kreutzer, Jr. opened fire at Fort Bragg, killing an officer and wounding 18 other soldiers.
 Throughout 2002, there were three murders of military wives and one murder of a military ex-wife by the soldiers they were married to, and the murder of a husband in the military by his wife, all the soldiers stationed at Fort Bragg. Legal representatives or the soldiers argued the drug Mefloquine, also known as Larium, was responsible for their diminished mental capacity that led to the murders of their spouses. The Pentagon and the Army Medical Department sent specialists and investigators to address the situation. Reports released later attributed the murders to have come from psychological problems, not the drugs.
 On June 28, 2005, President George W. Bush gave a nationally televised speech at Fort Bragg to reaffirm the United States' mission in Iraq.
 On December 13, 2011, WWE hosted its annual Tribute to the Troops for Fort Bragg at the Fayetteville Crown Coliseum with special guest stars Robin Williams, Nickelback, and Mary J. Blige.
 On December 14, 2011, President Barack Obama gave a nationally televised speech thanking soldiers for their service in Operation Iraqi Freedom.
 In 2012, Ashley Broadway, the same-sex spouse of Lt. Col. Heather Mack, was denied full membership to the Association of Bragg Officers' Spouses.
 On June 28, 2012, Specialist Ricky G. Elder shot and killed Lieutenant Colonel Roy L. Tisdale of the 525th Battlefield Surveillance Brigade during a safety brief. The soldier also shot himself and injured two other fellow soldiers. He later died of his injuries.
 On January 20, 2013, Army Times highlights the experience of a married same-sex couple at Fort Bragg, both service members, who are denied the housing allowance and other benefits that are available to different-sex married service members.
 On March 8, 2016, Major League Baseball announced that the Atlanta Braves and Miami Marlins would play a special neutral-site game, the Fort Bragg Game, at the newly constructed Fort Bragg Stadium, on July 3, 2016. It was the first time that an active military installation has hosted a regular-season game of a professional sports league. The game was attended primarily by military members. In addition, the game was the first Major League Baseball regular season game ever held in the state of North Carolina. The ballpark was built on a disused golf course and sat 12,500 fans for the game, a 5–2 Marlins win televised live on ESPN. Following the conclusion of the game, the grandstands and other facilities were removed, and the field became a multi-use sporting ground.
 On Oct 21, 2020, the official Fort Bragg Twitter account sent out several sexually charged tweets.
 On April 18, 2021, Rolling Stone reported that at least 44 soldiers had died stateside at Fort Bragg in 2020, including a number of unsolved murders apparently linked to drug-trafficking among special operations soldiers.

Notable people

 Joseph Edward Duncan (1963–2021), serial killer
 Raymond Floyd (born 1942), professional golfer, member of the World Golf Hall of Fame
 Chris Hanburger (born 1941), former NFL linebacker, member of the Pro Football Hall of Fame
 Willie Hobson (born 1941), lawyer
 Patricia Horoho (born 1960), retired U.S. Army lieutenant general
 Ernie Logan (born 1968), former NFL football player
 Julianne Moore (born 1960), actress
 Joe Morris (born 1960), former NFL running back, Super Bowl champion and two-time Pro Bowl selection
 Passion Richardson (born 1975), Olympic track and field athlete who competed in sprinting events

Burials
Actress Martha Raye is buried on Fort Bragg in commemoration of her work with the USO during World War II and Vietnam.

See also

Notes

External links

 Government
 
 General information
 
 Military and Democracy – Segment from C-SPAN's Alexis de Tocqueville Tour, featuring interview with Lt. Gen. John M. Keane filmed at Fort Bragg.

Bragg
Braxton Bragg
Fayetteville, North Carolina metropolitan area
Bragg
Military history of North Carolina
Bragg
Populated places in Cumberland County, North Carolina
Populated places in Hoke County, North Carolina
Bragg